Zafar al-Kabir  is a Syrian village located in Abu al-Duhur Nahiyah in Idlib District, Idlib.  According to the Syria Central Bureau of Statistics (CBS), Zafar al-Kabir had a population of 444 in the 2004 census.

References 

Populated places in Idlib District